Unbreakable is a recurring professional wrestling event produced by Impact Wrestling. The original event was a pay-per-view card held during the month of September in 2005. The second event was an Impact Plus Monthly Special held in August 2019.

Events

References

Impact Wrestling pay-per-view events
Recurring events established in 2005